The milk-eye catshark (Apristurus nakayai)  is a species of shark in the family Scyliorhinidae found in Coriolis Bank off western New Caledonia. Its natural habitat is the open seas. The new deep-water catshark, Apristurus nakayai, is described from northern New Caledonian waters.

References

milk-eye catshark
Fish of New Caledonia
Endemic fauna of New Caledonia
Taxa named by Samuel Paco Iglésias 
milk-eye catshark